The , commonly known as the Sangi Hokusei Line, is a  narrow gauge railway line owned and operated by the , a Japanese private railway company. The line connects Nishi-Kuwana Station in Kuwana, Mie with Ageki Station in Inabe, Mie, in Japan. For many years the line was owned by major railway operator Kintetsu but control was transferred to Sangi in April 2003.

The name Hokusei (北勢) means "northern Mie". It is a kanji abbreviation of "north" (北) and "Ise" (伊勢). Ise (as opposed to "Mie") is used in the name because the northern and central parts of present-day Mie Prefecture were called Ise Province during the Edo era before the modern prefecture system was established.

Services
All services are classified , stopping at every station, and are wanman driver-only operation. Two services per hour operate during the day, increased to three per hour in the morning and evening peaks.

Stations

At Kuwana Station, a short walk from Nishi-Kuwana Station, passengers can transfer to the Kansai Main Line, the Nagoya Line, and the Yōrō Line.

History

Kintetsu acquired the line on 1 April 1965, and from 1 April 2003, it was operated by the Sangi Railway.

Narrow gauge
The track gauge is especially narrow. In the early 20th century many of Japan's local railway lines were built using this gauge, however the vast majority of them were widened in the mid 20th century. Today, there are only four  gauge train lines in operation in Japan, of which the Hokusei Line is the longest. This rarity makes the Hokusei Line (as well as the other  gauge lines) popular with Japanese and other railway enthusiasts.

762 mm gauge railways of Japan
 Sangi Railway: Hokusei Line (this line)
 Yokkaichi Asunarou Railway: Utsube Line (also in northern Mie Prefecture)
 Yokkaichi Asunarou Railway: Hachiōji Line (small line branching off of the Utsube Line)
 Kurobe Gorge Railway (Kurobe, Toyama)

References
This article incorporates material from the corresponding article in the Japanese Wikipedia.

Rail transport in Mie Prefecture
2 ft 6 in gauge railways in Japan
750 V DC railway electrification